Matti Peltola (born 3 July 2002) is a Finnish football player who plays as midfielder for Veikkausliiga club HJK.

References

2002 births
Living people
Finnish footballers
Helsingin Jalkapalloklubi players
Finland youth international footballers
Veikkausliiga players
Association football midfielders